HIV-associated lipodystrophy is a condition characterized by loss of subcutaneous fat associated with infection with HIV.

Presentation
HIV-associated lipodystrophy commonly presents with fat loss in face, buttocks, arms and legs.

There is also fat accumulation in various body parts.  Patients often present with "buffalo hump"-like fat deposits in their upper backs.  Breast size of patients (both male and female) tends to increase. In addition, patients develop abdominal obesity.

Cause
The exact mechanism of HIV-associated lipodystrophy is not fully elucidated. There is evidence indicating both that it can be caused by anti-retroviral medications and that it can be caused by HIV infection in the absence of anti-retroviral medication.

Evidence implicating anti-retroviral medications 

On the one hand, lipodystrophy seems to be mainly due to HIV-1 protease inhibitors. Interference with lipid metabolism is postulated as pathophysiology. Also, the development of lipodystrophy is associated with specific nucleoside reverse transcriptase inhibitors (NRTI). Mitochondrial toxicity is postulated to be involved in the pathogenesis associated with NRTI.

Evidence implicating HIV infection alone 
On the other hand, there is evidence that HIV-1 infection on its own contributes to the development of the lipodystrophic phenotype by interfering with some key genes of adipocyte differentiation and mitochondrial function on patients which have not received antiretroviral treatment.

Management
GHRH analogs such as tesamorelin can be used to treat HIV-associated lipodystrophy.

Prognosis
Reversion of lipodystrophy does not occur after withdrawal of protease inhibitors.

See also 
 Drug-induced lipodystrophy
 Lipodystrophy
 List of cutaneous conditions

References

External links 

Conditions of the subcutaneous fat
HIV/AIDS